The Local Government Act 1974 (c. 7) is an Act of the Parliament of the United Kingdom that followed the Local Government Act 1972, introducing further minor changes to the system of local government in England and Wales. It also introduced the Local Government and Social Care Ombudsman.

United Kingdom Acts of Parliament 1974
Local government legislation in England and Wales
Acts of the Parliament of the United Kingdom concerning England and Wales